Liviu Alexandru Dumitrescu (born 10 May 1988, Ploieşti) is a Romanian sprint canoeist who has competed since the late 2000s. He won two gold medals at the 2010 ICF Canoe Sprint World Championships in Poznań, earning them in the C-2 500 m and C-2 1000 m events.  He has since won two more, in the C-2 500 m in 2011 and the C-2 1000 m in 2014.

References

External links

Living people
Romanian male canoeists
Canoeists at the 2012 Summer Olympics
Olympic canoeists of Romania
ICF Canoe Sprint World Championships medalists in Canadian
1988 births
Sportspeople from Ploiești
Canoeists at the 2015 European Games
European Games competitors for Romania
20th-century Romanian people
21st-century Romanian people